The  is a co-educational private school in Montevideo, Uruguay. Founded in 1869 as the first secular and private school in Uruguay and the main inspirer of the Varelian Reform, it provides day education to boys and girls aged 2–18.

It serves preschool, primary school, and secondary school, the senior high school programs, including the Bachillerato Diversificado and bilingual education by the International Baccalaureate. Since 2013, it also serves the degree in primary education teaching and a Licentiate in Education recognized by the Ministry of Education and Culture at the Elbio Fernández University Institute (IUEF).

Elbio Fernández School has educated a wide range of notable alumni, including intellectuals, athletes, media people, businessmen, and politicians such as 3 presidents of Uruguay and a vice president.

History 
The Escuela y Liceo Elbio Fernández was founded on September 3, 1869, by the Society of Friends of Popular Education (SAEP), a non-profit institution created in 1868 with the aim of promoting popular education, being inspired by the Varelian Reform –reform carried out by José Pedro Varela in 1876 that established free, compulsory and secular education in Uruguay–. Among the young founders and first members of the society are Carlos María Ramírez, Elbio Fernández and José Pedro Varela. 

In 1915, Professor Jerónimo Zolesi founded the Liceo (high school), which is why it changed its name to Escuela y Liceo Elbio Fernández. Zolesi served as the high school principal, until his death in 1938.

The motto of the school, which is found on its shield, insignia and hymn is Luz más luz (Light, more light), the last sentence pronounced by Johann Wolfgang von Goethe before he died. In 2004, the school became the first private institution in the country to offer a technological baccalaureate in administration, construction, sports and recreation, information technology, and tourism, granting students technical degrees upon graduation from high school.

In 2019 on the occasion of the 150th Anniversary of the School, radio interviews were carried out with notable alumni.

Campus 
The Elbio Fernández School campus is currently located in multiple buildings in barrio Palermo, Montevideo, depending on the educational stage. Likewise, the institution has a sports field in Neptunia, Canelones Department.

Alumni 
Several prominent personalities in different fields have attended the Elbio Fernández School:

 Dora Isella Russell, poet and journalist
 Gonzalo Aguirre Ramírez, politician and 10th Vice President of Uruguay
 José Enrique Rodó, essayist

 Jorge Batlle Ibáñez, politician and 38th President of the Republic
 Roberto Caldeyro-Barcia, doctor
 Horacio Ferrer, writer and poet
 Federico García Vigil, conductor and composer
 Luis Alberto de Herrera, politician 
 Juan Andrés Ramírez, politician
 Giannina Silva, model and television personality

 Antonio Larreta, critic and actor
 Julio María Sanguinetti, politiand and 35th and 37th President of the Republic

 Julio César Ribas, former footballer
 Hugo Achugar, poet and essayist
 Martín Lema, politician 
 Rodrigo Arocena, mathematician and academic
 Andy Vila, actress and television presenter

References

External links 

 Escuela y Liceo Elbio Fernández website
 Society of Friends of Popular Education website
 
 

Schools in Montevideo
Private schools in Uruguay
Educational institutions established in 1869